The Maryland Office of the Comptroller is a state agency charged with the fiscal responsibilities of the state of Maryland. It is the state equivalent of the United States Internal Revenue Service.

Organization
The chief executive officer is the comptroller, which is an elected position of four years.
The current Comptroller of Maryland is Brooke Lierman (D), currently serving her term (2023–present).
The comptroller appoints two deputy comptrollers and a chief of staff.
The Field Enforcement Unit (FEU) is the enforcement arm of the office. The FEU employs state agents, who are fully certified police officers, comparable to IRS agents.
The Field Enforcement Unit enforces the laws of the State of Maryland as it pertains to the following: alcoholic beverages, tobacco, motor fuels, business licenses, and the sales and use tax.

References

External links
 

Comptroller
State law enforcement agencies of Maryland